Tatanka may refer to:

Tatanka Iyotake (1831–1890), better known as Sitting Bull, medicine man and leader of the Hunkpapa Sioux
American bison, called tatanka in the Lakota language
 Tatanka (wrestler) (born 1965), ring name of American professional wrestler Chris Chavis
 Tatanka (film), a 2011 drama film
 Tatanka, a traditional Polish drink made with Żubrówka and apple juice
 "Tatanka" a song from Devil's Canyon by Molly Hatchet
 Pedro Tatanka, the vocalist of Portuguese band The Black Mamba